Eduard Rohde (25 September 1828 – 25 March 1883) was a German composer and organist. Born in Halle, Germany in 1828, he was a pupil of August Gottfried Ritter, and later a choirmaster at the St. Georgenkirche and singing teacher at the Sophien-Gymnasium in Berlin. Rohde was also a royal music director. Eduard Rohde had a son named Eduard Rohde Jr. (2 May 1856 – 1931), also a composer, and died in Berlin in 1883. He wrote piano pieces, motets, part-songs, a sonata, instrumental and vocal works, as well as an elementary textbook for piano. His pupils include Arthur H. Bird.

Works 

 Dance of the Dragonflies
 Marionettes
 Album Leaf
 Butterfly Op. 36, No. 8
 6 Tonbuilder, Op. 50
 Fliegende Blätter, Op. 36
 Fugue in E minor
 Élégie in G minor
 Triolett, Op. 32
 Elfenreigen, Op. 111
 Volks-Lieder, Op. 137
 Zwiegesang, Op. 146, No. 2
 Sommerabend (op. 50)
 Der Blumen Rache (op. 141)
 Schildehorn (op. 128)
 V. sonata (op. 170)

References

 https://www.organ-biography.info/index.php?id=Rohde_E_1828

External links
Heine in der Musik. 6. Komponisten N - R, p. 390

1828 births
1883 deaths
19th-century German composers
19th-century German male musicians
19th-century organists
German male composers
German male organists
German organists
People from Halle (Saale)